The 1869 Minnesota gubernatorial election was held on November 2, 1869 to elect the governor of Minnesota.

Results

References

1869
Minnesota
gubernatorial
November 1869 events